The 2010-2014 Toronto City Council was created following the  general election in 2010.

Leadership
Speaker Frances Nunziata was elected December 1, 2014

The Mayor of Toronto for this session was Rob Ford.

City  council

On October 25, 2010, a record number of women were elected to council, with 15 female councillors comprising one third of all council members.

See also
 2010 budget of the municipal government of Toronto

References

Municipal government of Toronto
2010 establishments in Ontario
2014 disestablishments in Ontario
2010s in Toronto